Neocollyris arnoldi is a species of ground beetle in the genus Neocollyris in the family Carabidae. It was described by William Sharp Macleay in 1825.

References

Arnoldi, Neocollyris
Beetles described in 1825